Fork River is an unincorporated community in the Rural Municipality of Mossey River, Manitoba, Canada.

Mainly surrounded by farmland, it is located about 13 km south of Winnipegosis, Manitoba, 25 minutes north of Dauphin. Fork River at one time had over 200 inhabitants, but that number has since dwindled.

Amenities 

The community had a number of stores and used to have regular stops from passing trains; however, as the tracks began to no longer be used, and as the population declined, the stores eventually dwindled away with the last one closing in 1996. As of the turn of the millennium, the tracks have been removed and commodities are transported solely by large trucks.

The community still has an operational granary. Its main route of transportation is Highway 20. Fork River also has a skating rink that has over 100 people that visit over a winter season. The hall is also used for many weddings and socials, and has a weekly Thursday night Bingo.

External links

Unincorporated communities in Parkland Region, Manitoba